Lemhi County is a county located in the U.S. state of Idaho. As of the 2020 census, the population was 7,974. The largest city and county seat is Salmon. The county was established in 1869, named after Fort Lemhi (or Limhi), a remote Mormon missionary settlement from 1855 to 1858 in Bannock and Shoshone territory.

Traffic signals
Main (Hwy 28) and Challis (Hwy 93), Salmon
Main (Hwy 93) and Church, Salmon

Geography
It is the fourth-largest county in Idaho by area. The river cuts through the center of Lemhi County before turning west. The county's eastern border with Beaverhead County, Montana, is the Continental Divide.

Adjacent counties
Idaho County, Idaho – northwest/Pacific Time border
Ravalli County, Montana – north
Beaverhead County, Montana – northeast
Clark County, Idaho – east
Butte County, Idaho – south
Custer County, Idaho – southwest
Valley County, Idaho – west

National protected areas
 Challis National Forest (part)
 Salmon National Forest (part)
 Targhee National Forest (part)
 Frank Church—River of No Return Wilderness (part)

History

Native settlement
Habitation of the Lemhi and Salmon Rivers dates back 14,000 years ago. Early natives were spear hunters of big game. The Salmon River was the dividing point among the first cultural split which occurred after 5,000 BC. The Lemhi band of Shoshoni developed culturally in similar fashion to other Shoshoni tribes located south of and east of the Salmon River. The Lemhi band of Shoshoni gained early access to horses and had developed into a migratory culture. They were also known as "Salmon Eaters". Their migratory pattern consisted of fishing for salmon in the Lemhi Valley in the summer, digging camas on Camas Creek in the spring, and hunting buffalo in the Three Forks area of the Missouri River. They were also known to travel to trade with other tribes. The Lemhi band was forced to a reservation on February 12, 1875, even though the tribe failed to ratify the treaty creating it in 1868. The reservation was disbanded in 1907 and the tribe sent to Fort Hall.

Exploration and early settlement
The Lewis and Clark Expedition entered Idaho on August 12, 1805, at Lemhi Pass in present-day Lemhi County. Meriwether Lewis and three other members of the expedition were the first Americans of European descent to enter what is now Idaho. For Sacajawea, their guide and interpreter, the Lemhi Valley was her birthplace and her brother was the Chief of the Lemhi band. Clark went out to scout the expedition's route. Within a month, travel down the Salmon and Snake Rivers was ruled out and the expedition headed for Lolo Pass on the Bitterroot Range. Michael Bourdon of the Hudson's Bay Company established the Lemhi Valley as a base of trapping operations in 1822. The region would support trapping operations for about 20 years. Finnan McDonald, Alexander Ross, David Skene Ogden, Jedediah Smith, and Jim Bridger all spent time in the area. Exploration of the full Salmon River from its source to the Snake River did not occur until 1832. Mormon settlers established Fort Lemhi from 1855 to 1858. The settlement was withdrawn after a native attack on the settlement. The first gold miners ventured into Lemhi County in 1862, with miners working the main Salmon River all the way from Salmon down to Slate Creek.

Mining settlements
F.B. Sharkey and his party struck gold at Leesburg on July 16, 1866. The rush to Leesburg ensued within a month. A stagecoach route was established from Montana in May 1867 to the present location of Salmon City. Additional discovery of gold occurred at Lemhi in 1867 and Shoup in 1868. Salmon City became the county seat of Lemhi County when it was formed in 1869. Additional mining operations occurred at Yellow Jacket in 1869, Gibbonsville in 1877, Gilmore in 1880, Blackbird in 1892, and Leadore in 1904. The Gilmore and Pittsburgh Railroad was completed from Dubois to Salmon on May 18, 1910. The railroad was built to access ore from Gilmore. The railroad ceased operations in 1940.

Development of cities
Salmon City was platted in 1867. While Salmon has gone by the name Salmon City since its inception, it did not have legal status as a city until around 1900.

Leadore and Patterson were incorporated as villages in 1947. Patterson was disincorporated by 1980.

County-boundary history
At the start of mining operations in present-day Lemhi County in 1862, the region was fully within Idaho County, Washington Territory. Boise County was created in 1863, with its northern boundary running just north of the ridge dividing Birch Creek) from the Lemhi River. Under Idaho Territory, the southern portion became part of Alturas County on February 2, 1864, and the dividing line between Alturas and Idaho Counties was adjusted to 44° 30′ North latitude. The Idaho territorial legislature actually created Lemhi County twice. The first occasion was on December 21, 1866. A county government was organized at Salmon City, yet the bill approving the county was misplaced and never published in session laws. The following session, the legislature passed the bill again, officially creating Lemhi County on January 9, 1869. The county government was reorganized at Salmon City on February 22, 1870. The western and southern county boundaries for Lemhi were problematic and adjusted frequently. At its creation, Lemhi inherited Idaho County's southern and eastern boundaries, which effectively created two areas of noncontiguous territory, with one of the sections containing territory along the Salt Lake to Virginia City stagecoach route just north of the present town of Humphrey, Idaho. Finalization of the southern boundary came in several steps from 1885 to 1896. In 1885, the boundary was moved southward, gaining territory in present Clark County, creating a contiguous boundary, and leaving a  stretch of the Birch Creek Area in Alturas County. The eastern  portion of that territory was transferred from Alturas to Bingham in 1889. A change in 1891 extended the boundary south to its present location and added territory presently in Clark County. With legislative approval, voters in that territory voted to become part of Fremont County in 1896, finalizing the southern and eastern boundary. At Lemhi's creation, the western boundary was a line drawn from the Bitterroot Mountains to the southern line of Idaho County. The boundary was moved westward to the divide between the Payette and Salmon Rivers in 1873, moved eastward to a line drawn through the confluence of the Middle Fork and main Salmon rivers in 1885, and then mistakenly extended to the northern line of Idaho County in 1903 before being finalized at its present location in 1911. Custer County was partitioned from Lemhi in 1881 with its initial boundary excluding the Loon Creek area. The Loon Creek area was transferred back to Idaho County in 1885.

Demographics

2000 census
As of the census of 2000, there were 7,806 people, 3,275 households, and 2,217 families living in the county. The population density was 2 people per square mile (1/km2). There were 4,154 housing units at an average density of 1 per square mile (0/km2). The racial makeup of the county was 96.63% White, 0.10% Black or African American, 0.60% Native American, 0.18% Asian, 0.04% Pacific Islander, 0.77% from other races, and 1.68% from two or more races. 2.18% of the population were Hispanic or Latino of any race. 19.5% were of German, 18.0% English, 11.4% American and 6.5% Irish ancestry.

There were 3,275 households, out of which 28.60% had children under the age of 18 living with them, 57.80% were married couples living together, 6.90% had a female householder with no husband present, and 32.30% were non-families. 27.70% of all households were made up of individuals, and 12.40% had someone living alone who was 65 years of age or older. The average household size was 2.38 and the average family size was 2.91.

In the county, the population was spread out, with 25.50% under the age of 18, 5.50% from 18 to 24, 22.70% from 25 to 44, 29.50% from 45 to 64, and 16.80% who were 65 years of age or older. The median age was 43 years. For every 100 females there were 99.20 males. For every 100 females age 18 and over, there were 97.50 males.

The median income for a household in the county was $30,185, and the median income for a family was $35,261. Males had a median income of $30,558 versus $18,289 for females. The per capita income for the county was $16,037. About 10.60% of families and 15.30% of the population were below the poverty line, including 19.80% of those under age 18 and 10.30% of those age 65 or over.

2010 census
As of the 2010 United States Census, there were 7,936 people, 3,576 households, and 2,267 families living in the county. The racial makeup of the county was 96.4% white, 0.7% American Indian, 0.4% Asian, 0.2% black or African American, 0.6% from other races, and 1.6% from two or more races. Those of Hispanic or Latino origin made up 2.3% of the population. In terms of ancestry, 25.9% were German, 22.4% were English, 13.0% were Irish, 9.9% were American, and 6.2% were Swedish.

Of the 3,576 households, 22.9% had children under the age of 18 living with them, 52.7% were married couples living together, 6.9% had a female householder with no husband present, 36.6% were non-families, and 31.7% of all households were made up of individuals. The average household size was 2.20 and the average family size was 2.74. The median age was 49.7 years.

The median income for a household in the county was $36,411 and the median income for a family was $49,119. Males had a median income of $37,763 versus $21,233 for females. The per capita income for the county was $21,699. About 13.0% of families and 20.0% of the population were below the poverty line, including 36.3% of those under age 18 and 8.3% of those age 65 or over.

Communities

Cities
 Leadore
 Salmon

Unincorporated communities

 Carmen
 Cobalt
 Elk Bend
 Gibbonsville
 Lemhi
 May
 North Fork
 Patterson
 Shoup
 Tendoy

Politics
Like all of southeastern Idaho, Lemhi County has long been powerfully Republican. In no presidential election since 1940 has the county selected the Democratic nominee, and the last Democrat to pass 30 percent of the county's vote was Michael Dukakis in 1988.

See also
 National Register of Historic Places listings in Lemhi County, Idaho
 County Parcel Map

References

External links

 

 

 
Idaho counties
Populated places established in 1869
1869 establishments in Idaho Territory